The 2017 Qatari Stars Cup was the seventh edition of Qatari Stars Cup. 

The tournament featured 12 teams divided into 2 groups. The draw for the group took place on 8 September 2017 at the headquarters in Al Bidda.

Round One Groups

Standings

Group A

Results

Group B

Results

Knockout round

Semi-finals

Final

References

Qatari Stars Cup
Qatari Stars Cup
Qatari Stars Cup